Nariño may refer to:

People 
Antonio Nariño (1765–1824), early Colombian political and military leader

Colombia 
Nariño Department, one of the 32 Departments of Colombia
Nariño, Antioquia, a town and municipality
Nariño, Cundinamarca, a town and municipality
Nariño, Nariño, a town and municipality
Nariño (TransMilenio), a bus station in Bogotá
Nariño culture, a civilization of western Colombia